McGill University Library is the library system of McGill University in Montréal, Québec, Canada. It comprises  13 branch libraries, located on the downtown Montreal and Macdonald campuses, holding over 11.78 million items. It is the fourth-largest research intensive academic library in Canada and received an A− from The Globe and Mails 2011 University Report, the highest grade awarded to the library of a large university.

Description 

The largest of the branch libraries is the Humanities and Social Sciences Library, which is housed in the McLennan and Redpath Library Buildings. The Humanities and Social Sciences Library has notable collections in Canadian Studies, English and American Literature, British History, Russian and East European Studies, and World War II.

The Library's ROAAr Group was formed in 2016 to unite Rare Books and Special Collections, The Osler Library of the History of Medicine, The Visual Arts Collection, and Archives and Records Management. 

Rare Books and Special collections contains holdings on a variety of subjects, including art and architecture, Canadiana, history, literature, the history of ideas, travel and exploration, and the history of the book. The Lawrence Lande Collection of Canadiana consists of 12,000 items, including books, pamphlets, maps, prints, periodicals, government documents, and broadsides.

The Osler Library of the History of Medicine, in the McIntyre Medical Building, is Canada's foremost scholarly resource in the history of medicine, and one of the most important libraries of its type in North America. As of 2011, the Humanities and Social Sciences Library and the Schulich Library of Physical Sciences, Life Sciences, and Engineering are open 24/7 in most cases during midterms and finals during the academic year.

The Islamic Studies Library, located in Morrice Hall with the McGill University Institute of Islamic Studies that prepares graduate students for M.A. and Ph.D. degrees, is one of the largest collections of its kind in Canada.

The McGill University Library's Cyberthèque – a large-scale, multi-purpose information facility – opened its doors to McGill students in 2008. Located in the Redpath Library Building at street level, the "experiential" Cyberthèque blends a diverse range of studying and learning spaces for groups and individuals, various technology and multi-media installations, and timely assistance in accessing and using information. This unique facility was designed by Montréal architect François Emond and his team at ékm architecture together with Douglas Birkenshaw, and his team at Bregmann + Hamann from Toronto.

Branch libraries
See map of branch libraries.

Birks Reading Room
Humanities and Social Sciences Library
Blackader-Lauterman Collection of Architecture and Art
Islamic Studies Library
Education Curriculum Resource Centre
Edward Rosenthall Mathematics and Statistics Library
MacDonald Campus Library
Marvin Duchow Music Library
Nahum Gelber Law Library
Schulich Library of Physical Sciences, Life Sciences, and Engineering

Special Branches (ROAAr Units) 

 Osler Library of the History of Medicine
 Rare Books and Special Collections
 McGill University Archives
 Visual Arts Collection

Partnerships and collaboration
The Library is a member of the Canadian Association of Research Libraries, the Association of Research Libraries (ARL), and the Conférence des recteurs et des principaux des universités du Québec (CREPUQ), as well as other cooperative groups. The Library is a contributor to the Open Content Alliance

Projects

As of 2010, one of the Library's major projects involves digitization of books in the public domain. In 2013 the McGill library became the second non-US based partner institution with HathiTrust digital library  and plans on making their digitized collections available through this repository. The library regularly contributes unique digitized public domain from their collections to the Internet Archive.

History 
From 1862 to 1893 the library was located in the west wing of the Arts Building (Molson Hall), where the collection slowly expanded.  In 1893 the Redpath Library opened in what is now Redpath Hall. At the same time, the first full-time University Librarian, Charles H. Gould (1893-1919) was appointed. Under Gould and Gerhard Lomer (1920-1947) both the collection and staff expanded. By the 1920s and 1930s the central library's lack of space meant that there was more departmental and area libraries being established.

In 1952 a large addition to Redpath Hall was opened to the south and the east wall of the original building was enclosed. It was at this time the library reading room was moved over what is now known at the Redpath library building and the Hall became a music hall. It was during this time that the University Librarian became primarily responsible for this main library collection that covered the humanities and social sciences discipline. Area libraries in Medicine, Law, Engineering, Physical Sciences, Divinity, Nursing and other disciplines were still largely independent. In 1969, McLennan Library (Humanities and Social Sciences) opened, and Senate set up a University Libraries Commission whose Report (1971) recommended reorganization and greater coordination in the administration of the library systems.

References

External links
McGill Library Official website
Fontanus: from the collections of McGill University library journal
Medical Library Archives Collection, Osler Library Archives, McGill University. Collection of primary sources documenting the growth of the Medical Library at McGill University.

Libraries in Montreal
McGill University
Academic libraries in Canada